Benoît Dusablon (born  August 1, 1979) is a Canadian former professional ice hockey centre who played three games in the National Hockey League (NHL) with the New York Rangers. As a youth, he played in the 1992 and 1993 Quebec International Pee-Wee Hockey Tournaments with minor ice hockey teams from Central Mauricie and Sainte-Foy, Quebec City.

References

External links

1979 births
Living people
Canadian ice hockey centres
Charlotte Checkers (1993–2010) players
Halifax Mooseheads players
Hartford Wolf Pack players
Ice hockey people from Quebec
Johnstown Chiefs players
New York Rangers players
People from Mauricie
Tallahassee Tiger Sharks players
Undrafted National Hockey League players
Val-d'Or Foreurs players